Paul Atalig Manglona is a member of the Northern Mariana Islands Senate from Rota. Manglona was appointed to the Senate on February 10, 2016 to succeed Victor Hocog upon Hocog’s elevation to Lieutenant Governor of the Northern Mariana Islands.

Biography
He was born to Prudencio Taisacan Manglona, a longtime Mayor of Rota, and Bernadita Atalig Manglona. He graduated from Father Duenas Memorial High School in Guam in 1976 as the valedictorian. He then graduated from Santa Clara University with a BA Degree in civil engineering and further studied at San Jose State University. He returned to the Northern Mariana Islands and worked for the CMS Construction before working for Rota's Public Works. 

Manglona was first elected to the Senate in 1987 as a Republican. Manglona lost the 2012 Senate election to Republican Victor Hocog. During his first tenue, Manglona served as the chamber’s president on multiple occasions.

References

Year of birth missing (living people)
20th-century American politicians
21st-century American politicians
Living people
Presidents of the Northern Mariana Islands Senate

People from Rota (island)
Northern Mariana Islands politicians
Republican Party (Northern Mariana Islands) politicians